Anadolu Kartalları (Anatolian Eagles) is a Turkish film directed by Ömer Vargi and released in 2011. It is produced by the production company Fida Film, and stars Engin Altan Düzyatan, Özge Özpirinçci and Çağatay Ulusoy.

The film, commissioned for the centenary of the Turkish Air Force, was filmed in collaboration with the Turkish Air Force in the air base in Konya. Some aerial scenes were notably performed by Türk Yıldızları and Solo Türk, the aerobatic team of the Turkish Air Force. After cult film 1963  ”Şafak Bekçileri” about airforce, Anadolu Kartalları is second big film about Turkish airforce.

The film is the sixth-biggest hit of 2011 Turkish box office, with a total of 1,179,190 entries and grossing 10,217,302 Turkish liras.

Cast 
 Engin Altan Düzyatan – Kemal Tanaçan 
 Çağatay Ulusoy – Onur Ahmet
 Özge Özpirinçci – Ayşe Dinçer
 Hande Subaşı – Müzisyen Burcu
  – Mustafa Hızarcı
  – Fatih Karakuş
 Ekin Türkmen – Özlem

References

External links
 

2011 films
2011 romantic drama films
2010s adventure drama films
Turkish romantic drama films
Turkish aviation films
Films about air forces
Turkish adventure drama films
Films set in İzmir
Films shot in İzmir